This is a list of active, dormant and extinct volcanoes in Australia and its island territories. Note that the term volcano is used loosely as it can include groups of related volcanoes and vents that erupted at similar times with lava of related origin. The lists provided below are mainly volcanoes of Cenozoic aged, with some notable older (Mesozoic and Paleozoic aged), volcanoes included. There are no volcanoes on the Australian mainland that have erupted since European settlement, but some volcanoes in Victoria, South Australia and North Queensland could have been witnessed by Aboriginal people several thousand years ago.  There are active volcanoes in the Heard and McDonald Islands.

Australian states

Queensland

New South Wales

Victoria

South Australia 
South Australia's volcanoes are the youngest in Australia, and erupted within the memory of local Indigenous peoples. They are all in the Limestone Coast region, in the Mount Burr Range. They are considered dormant rather than extinct.

Western Australia 
There are no active or dormant volcanoes in Western Australia, although there are a number of extinct ones, and geological evidence of others. There are nineteen small extinct volcanoes in the valley of the Fitzroy River in the Kimberley region of Western Australia. The Kimberley also has a number of groups of hot springs, which may be connected with the volcanic activity that produced the extinct volcanoes (but since these volcanic formations are Proterozoic in age – i.e. maybe a billion years old, this would be very unlikely). There are also deposits of basalt at Bunbury and Cape Gosselin.

Tasmania

Territories

Australia Capital Territory

Heard and McDonald Islands

Lord Howe Island

Australia Antarctic Territory

Norfolk Island
Norfolk Island and neighbouring Nepean Island and Phillip Island are mountain top remnants of an elongated shield volcano.

Tasman Sea

Other

References 
 Citations

 Sources

 Volcanoes of Australia, Volcano World

External links
 Northern Rivers Geology Blog – Volcanoes and Vulcanology
 Volcanoes of Australia – John Seach

Australia
 
Volcanoes
Volcanoes